The 1885 Cincinnati Red Stockings season was a season in American baseball. The team finished second in the American Association, 16 games behind the St. Louis Browns.

Regular season 
During the off-season, the Red Stockings hired O. P. Caylor to become the manager of the team, the first time in club history that the club did not have a player-manager. Cincinnati also signed Tony Mullane to a contract.  Mullane, who spent the 1884 season with the Toledo Blue Stockings, had a 36–26 record with a 2.52 ERA in 67 starts, striking out 325 batters. Mullane was suspended for the 1885 season for defying his contract, as the Blue Stockings and the St. Louis Maroons, another team he tried to sign with, folded after the 1884 season, and the St. Louis Browns attempted to reclaim Mullane, as he pitched there in 1883. Before the Browns could reclaim him, he signed with the Red Stockings.

Frank Fennelly, who the Red Stockings acquired late in the 1884 season from the Washington Nationals, had a breakout season, hitting .273 with ten home runs and a league high 89 RBI.  Charley Jones led the team with a .322 average, and had five home runs and 35 RBI to go along with it, while John Reilly hit .297 with five homers and 60 RBI.

On the mound, nineteen-year-old Larry McKeon led the Red Stockings with 20 wins and a 2.86 ERA in 33 starts, while Will White had eighteen wins and a 3.53 ERA in 34 starts.

Season summary 
Cincinnati began the season very well, putting up an impressive 16–8 record in their first 24 games to sit in second place in the league, two games behind the St. Louis Browns. The Red Stockings then began to slump, as they would win only six of their next sixteen games to slip into third place, seven games behind the Browns. On July 1, the Red Stockings acquired Jim Keenan and Larry McKeon, who both jumped from the Detroit Wolverines to join Cincinnati. The Red Stockings improved with their new acquisitions in the lineup, as the team eventually moved back into second place, however, they were too far behind the Browns, and Cincinnati finished the season with a 63–49 record, good for second place, however, they were sixteen games out of first.

Season standings

Record vs. opponents

Notable transactions 
 July 1, 1885: Jim Keenan jumped to the Red Stockings from the Detroit Wolverines.

Roster

Player stats

Batting

Starters by position 
Note: Pos = Position; G = Games played; AB = At bats; H = Hits; Avg. = Batting average; HR = Home runs; RBI = Runs batted in

Other batters 
Note: G = Games played; AB = At bats; H = Hits; Avg. = Batting average; HR = Home runs; RBI = Runs batted in

Pitching

Starting pitchers 
Note: G = Games pitched; IP = Innings pitched; W = Wins; L = Losses; ERA = Earned run average; SO = Strikeouts

Other pitchers 
Note: G = Games pitched; IP = Innings pitched; W = Wins; L = Losses; ERA = Earned run average; SO = Strikeouts

Relief pitchers 
Note: G = Games pitched; W = Wins; L = Losses; SV = Saves; ERA = Earned run average; SO = Strikeouts

References

External links 
1885 Cincinnati Red Stockings season at Baseball Reference

Cincinnati Reds seasons
Cincinnati Red Stockings season
Cincinnati Reds